Phalanx Biotech Group was founded in 2002 as a result of collaboration between Taiwan's Industrial Technology Research Institute (ITRI) and several private companies and research institutes. It is a manufacturer of DNA microarrays and a provider of gene expression profiling and microRNA profiling services based in Hsinchu, Taiwan, San Diego, California, Shanghai, China, and in Beijing, China. The company sells its DNA microarrays and service platform under the registered trademark name OneArray.

Phalanx Biotech Group is a member of the FDA-led Microarray Quality Control Project.

Description of Products and Services
Phalanx Biotech Group is a manufacturer and provider of DNA microarray products and services used for gene expression profiling and miRNA profiling.

Human, Mouse, Rat and Yeast whole genome OneArray DNA microarrays are manufactured and used for gene expression profiling products and services.

The miRNA profiling products and services include miRNA OneArray microarrays and related services for Human, Rodent, and many Model organism and Plant species.

Other than the OneArray services, Phalanx also offers Agilent microarray services, qPCR services, PCR array profiling services, and NGS services. Each one of these services can be accompanied by an extensive, customizable bioinformatics package.

Manufacturing
The DNA microarrays are produced using a patented non-contact inkjet deposition of intact oligonucleotides. This is performed using a patented inkjet dispensing apparatus. The oligonucleotides are deposited on a standard size 25mm X 75mm glass slide.

Milestones

See also
 List of companies of Taiwan

References

External links 
 Phalanx Biotech Group Company Website

2002 establishments in Taiwan
Companies based in Hsinchu
Biotechnology companies established in 2002
Biotechnology companies of Taiwan
Taiwanese brands
Microarrays